A moving skyscraper is a tall building in which individual floors can rotate on its axis. The world's first such building, the Suite Vollard, is located in Curitiba, Brazil. Another similar project is the Dynamic Tower in Dubai.

The Dynamic Tower 

The tower which will be built in Dubai is designed by Italian architect David Fisher. It will have a total number of 80 floors. All the floors are prefabricated and can spin 360 degrees around a central column by means of power generated by the wind turbine located between each floor. The apartments are expected to cost about $3.7 million to $36 million. The construction was expected to be completed by 2014. The projected cost of the project was 700 million dollars.

Moscow 
There are plans to build a 70-story skyscraper in Moscow as well.

References 

Skyscrapers by type
Residential skyscrapers in Dubai